Edward C. Lawson was an African American civil rights activist, who was the plaintiff in the case of Kolender v. Lawson, in which the United States Supreme Court ruled that a California statute authorizing a police officer to arrest a person for refusing to present identification was unconstitutionally vague.

Personal life

Aside from his landmark supreme court case, very few biographical details are known about Lawson, a man described by the Los Angeles Times as "mysterious, even secretive".  Reportedly he was a vegetarian, and claimed that he was entirely sober, refusing all drugs and alcohol.  He avoided discussing "exactly how he makes a living".

Civil rights case

Between March 1975 and January 1977, Lawson was detained approximately fifteen times, as a pedestrian or as a diner in a cafe, and asked to present identification; some detentions lasted minutes, others lasted hours. He was arrested several times pursuant to California Penal Code § 647(e),
but prosecuted only twice, with one conviction (the second charge was dismissed). In 1975, Lawson, representing himself (known as pro se), brought a civil rights action against San Diego Chief of Police William Kolender and others, taking the case through U.S. District Court and ultimately to the U.S. Supreme Court, which ruled in his favor.

The U.S. District Court ruled in Lawson's favor, enjoining enforcement of the law. Kolender appealed the ruling the United States Court of Appeals for the Ninth Circuit; the ruling in Lawson v. Kolender, 658 F.2d 1362 (9th Cir. 1981) upheld the District Court, voiding § 647(e).
Kolender appealed the ruling to the U.S. Supreme Court, which in 1983 upheld the Court of Appeals in voiding the law.
This case is of historical importance not only because the California statute was voided, but also because it is one of the few examples of an ordinary citizen successfully representing himself all the way through a U.S. District Court. Lawson received political support at the time from prominent Black leaders including Jesse Jackson, activist/comedian Dick Gregory, U.S. Congresswoman Maxine Waters D-Los Angeles, U.S. Congressman John Conyers D-Detroit.

Lawson's Supreme Court brief was accompanied by amici curiae briefs from the ACLU, the National Lawyers Guild, the NAACP Legal Defense and Educational Fund, and others.

In 1983, Carl Stern, the CBS Evening News U.S. Supreme Court reporter commented that this case was the most reported U.S. Supreme Court case that year. Stern was referring to front-page newspaper articles in The New York Times, The Washington Post, Chicago Tribune, The Miami Herald, Los Angeles Times as well as articles in Newsweek, Time, Fortune, The Village Voice and other news publications. Additionally, Lawson made repeated appearances on The Oprah Winfrey Show, The Phil Donahue Show, Larry King Live, Crossfire, The Ricki Lake Show, The Today Show, and Good Morning America.

Harvard University law professor Laurence Tribe commented during an appearance on The Oprah Winfrey Show that this case was the last time that the U.S. Supreme Court had decided in favor of a defendant in a civil rights case of this magnitude.

California Penal Code § 647(e) was repealed by the California Legislature in 2008.

See also

 Hiibel v. Sixth Judicial District Court of Nevada
 Kolender v. Lawson
 Police misconduct
 Racial profiling
 Stop and identify statutes
 Contempt of cop
 Driving while black
 Henry Louis Gates arrest controversy

Notes

External links

Edward C. Lawson—official website 
U.S. Supreme Court video story
Kolender v. Lawson, 461 U.S. 352 (1983)
Jon Shane, author
1921 Tulsa Race Riot -- CNN
1921 Tulsa Race Riot -- OSU Library
2009-2011 Newark NJ

Activists for African-American civil rights
Year of birth missing (living people)
Homelessness activists
Living people